Gwenaëlle Jullien (born 5 December 1982) is a French former competitive figure skater. She won bronze at the 1997 European Youth Olympic Festival, silver at the 1998 Junior Grand Prix in China, and finished in the top 15 at two World Junior Championships – 1997 (Seoul) and 1999 (Zagreb). She is a two-time senior national medalist, having won bronze in 1997 and silver in 2000. She trained in Amiens.

Competitive highlights 
JGP: Junior Grand Prix

References 

1982 births
French female single skaters
Living people
Sportspeople from Amiens